The 2017–18 Belgian Cup, called the Croky Cup for sponsorship reasons, was the 63rd season of Belgium's annual football cup competition. The competition began on 28 July 2017 and ended with the final on 17 March 2018. Zulte Waregem were the defending champions, but they were eliminated by Club Brugge in the Seventh Round. Standard Liège won the cup, beating Genk after extra time in the final. As the winner, Standard Liège was normally qualified for the 2018–19 UEFA Europa League Group Stage. As they ended 2nd in the Belgian Competition, they will participate in the 3rd qualification round of the Champions League.

Competition format
The Belgian Cup consists of ten rounds, with teams entering at different points, depending on their 2017-18 League standings.

 Rounds 1–3 will be decided by a penalty shoot-out if level after ninety minutes.
 Rounds 4–7 and the quarter-finals will go to extra time if level after ninety minutes with a penalty shoot-out after that if necessary.
 The semi-finals will be decided over two legs with the winner decided on aggregate.
 The final will be a single match with extra-time and penalties if necessary.

Round and draw dates

The draw for the first five rounds was made on 19 June 2017.

First round
Results from soccerway.com

The first round began with the teams from the provincial leagues and the Third Amateur Division (tiers 5 and below).

Second round
Fixtures from soccerway.com

In the second round the teams that won their ties in round one are joined by the teams from the Second Amateur Division.

Third round
Fixtures from soccerway.com

In round three, teams from the First Amateur Division join the winners from round two.

Fourth round

Fifth round

Sixth Round
The sixth round saw the entry of the Belgian First Division A teams. The matches were played on 19, 20 and 21 September 2017.

Seventh Round
The draw for the seventh round was made immediately after the last game of the sixth round, between Charleroi and La Louvière Centre, was finished. As all 16 teams from the Belgian First Division A won their match in the Sixth Round, no teams from a lower division made it into this round.

The matches were played on 28, 29, and 30 November 2017.

Quarter-finals
The draw for the quarter-finals was made on 30 November 2017, immediately after completion of the final match of the Seventh Round. The matches will be played on 12 and 13 December 2017.

Semi-finals
The draw for the semi-finals was supposed to occur right after conclusion of the quarter-final match between Club Brugge and Charleroi, but was postponed to the next day after the match was cancelled. The semi-final dates were also shifted, as the postponed match will take place on 16 January 2018, shifting the semi-final matches back by two weeks, with the first legs now played on 30, 31 January 2018 or 1 February 2018 and the second legs in the period from 6 to 8 February 2017.

First Legs

Second Legs

Final

The final took place on 17 March 2018 at the King Baudouin Stadium in Brussels and was won by Standard Liège.

References

Belgian Cup seasons
Belgian Cup
Cup